Piano, rumpu ja kukka (which means "a piano, a drum and a flower") is the first album by 22-Pistepirkko. It was released in 1984.

Track listing
"Kellarissa"
"Metsässä kukkia"
"Kathy"
"I Need Love"
"Sinun suuri sukusi"
"Prinsessa"
"Noita"
"Kuusi poikamiestä"
"Enkeli lensi pois"
"Jealouse & Joey"
"Let's Dance"
"Kissa"
"Soiva talo"

References
Discogs.com - Track Listing

22-Pistepirkko albums
1984 albums